Phoenix Marketcity is a shopping mall developed by Phoenix Mills Limited located in Chennai, Tamil Nadu, India. It was opened in January 2013 and is the 2nd largest mall in the city. It was the fourth largest mall in India in 2018.

It has a built up area of 1,500,000 square feet and leasable retail area of 1,000,000 square feet. Also there is a Palladium mall situated right next to it.

About
This mall was jointly developed by Phoenix Mills Limited and Crest Ventures Ltd. Phoenix Mall Chennai is part of a development which includes a premium residential space as part of Phase I. Phase II development includes a luxury mall called Palladium and residential space.

Entertainment
Phoenix Mall features an 11-screen multiplex which is also Chennai's first IMAX screen.

Palladium
Palladium, the first luxury and premium luxury retail and entertainment destination of Chennai, was launched alongside Phoenix Marketcity as its second branch in the country after the Mumbai one. It is also located in the same compound of Phoenix Marketcity Chennai.

Gallery

See also
Phoenix Market City (Bangalore)
High Street Phoenix
List of shopping malls in India

References 

Shopping malls in Chennai
Shopping malls established in 2013
2013 establishments in Tamil Nadu